Abujmarh is a hilly forest area, spread over  in Chhattisgarh, covering Narayanpur district, Bijapur district and Dantewada district. It is home to indigenous tribes of India, including Gond, Muria, Abuj Maria, and Halbaas. It was only in 2009 that the Government of Chhattisgarh lifted the restriction on the entry of common people in the area imposed in the early 1980s. Geographically isolated and largely inaccessible, the area continues to show no physical presence of the civil administration, and is also known as "liberated-zone" as it is an alleged hub of Naxalite-Maoist insurgency, the banned Communist Party of India (Maoist) and its military wing, People's Liberation Guerilla Army (PLGA), who run a parallel government in the area.

In 2007 the area was proposed as a biosphere reserve by Ministry of Environment and Forests, Government of India.

Etymology
The word  means "the unknown hills" ( means 'unknown' and  means 'hill') in the Gondi language native to the region.

Forest, about  equivalent to the present Bastar division. Dandakaranya, literally meaning "the abode of the demon Dandaka", also finds mention in Hindu epic, Ramayana.

The dense forests of Abujmarh have long been isolated from the outside world, inhabited largely the indigenous people, and accessible only via forest pathways starting from Narayanpur, Bijapur and Basroor. Geographically, the Indravati river segregates it from Bastar region, adding to its isolation. Recently the access to area has been further marred by heavy use of landmines by the insurgents at entry points. During the British rule in India, Abujmarh remained in isolation and constitutionally "excluded", though a land survey was done in 1873. After independence of India, its isolation continued, except when in 1958 the government refugees from East Bengal in the Dandakaranya area in the present Bastar division, and later the hills started getting exploited for its mineral wealth, like the Bailadila Hills excavated for its deposits of high-grade iron ore. The tribals remained backward and exploited by prevalent feudalism in India, majority of them started cultivation only recently, and education was undertaken only at small schools run either by NGOs and missionaries. All these conditions, after 1967 gave rise to the Naxalite movement, which grew and spread over the coming decades.

Abujmarh has been termed as "liberated zone", as due to its inaccessibility it remained untouched by any government presence and civil administration for the past 60 years and has developed a stronghold of Naxal-Maoist insurgents of the banned Communist Party of India (Maoist), which ran a parallel government, known as Janta Sarkar (People's government). Besides running its own military wing, People’s Liberation Guerrilla Army (PLGA) and training camps, Moaoist also runs small irrigation projects, courts known as jan adalat (People’s courts) and schools. The Times of India reported the existence of one such schools, known as "Janta Sarkar Bhoomkaal School" at Metapada, where besides elementary education, the students were also taught Naxal ideologies. After being pushed out of Andhra Pradesh, post 2003, Naxals made these forests their hub, and even established a revenue generation system which includes land sharing, cooperative farming and running foodgrain and seeds banks.

The state government had no records about the Muria tribes living in the region or land ownership or revenue records. Prior to 2006 a permit was required to enter the area. In June 2009, after a nearly 30-year restriction on the entry of outsides into the area, imposed by then Government of Madhya Pradesh, triggered by a controversial documentary made by a foreign channel, the Government of Chhattisgarh, a state carved out of Madhya Pradesh in 2000, eased the restrictions.

The attacks revealed use of sophisticated communication instruments, landmines and coordination amongst the Naxals. The next big attack came on 18 March 2007, when the Maoists attacked a police camp at Ranibodli, killing 55 policemen, including Special Police Officers (SPOs). "Operation Green Hunt" was launched in area in April 2010, but on 7 April, in an ambush by People's Liberation Guerilla Army (PLGA), 76 security persons were killed in Chintalnar.

Geography
Known for its rich in mineral deposits, it covers the Narayanpur district, Bijapur district and Dantewada district of Chhattisgarh state and is close to the borders of neighbouring Orissa, Andhra Pradesh and Maharashtra states. The Indravati river, which originates from Orissa, and is a tributary of the Godavari River, separates the area from Bastar. Even today, most of tribal villages in the area remain inaccessible for six months in a year.

In 2008, Ministry of Environment and Forests, Government of India proposed to designate Abujmarh as a biosphere reserve.

Demographics
A total population of 34,000 tribal inhabits 233 villages. As this area is largely uncharted, in 2009, satellite mapping of region was done by the Indian Space Research Organisation (ISRO) to locate villages.

Economy
Majority of the tribals live under dire poverty, and survive of the traditional shifting cultivation or slash-and-burnknown locally as for six months in a year, they cultivate a small grained rice, and for the rest of the period survive by selling the rice along with forest products like tendu leaves, and occasionally come out to the weekly markets,  of near by towns to sell their produce.

See also
 Red corridor

References

External links
 

Geography of Chhattisgarh
Bijapur district, Chhattisgarh
Narayanpur district
Dantewada district
Naxalite–Maoist insurgency
Forests of India